The Retired Enlisted Association (TREA) is a non-profit organization of the United States. Its mission is to enhance the quality of life for uniformed services enlisted personnel of the United States, their families and survivors - including active components, Reserves, and National Guard, and all retirees.

Background
TREA was founded by retired Master Sergeants George Skonce and Dean Sorell.  Together with other retired enlisted personnel they met at the Ent Air Force Base Non-Commissioned Officers' Club in Colorado Springs, Colorado to form The Retired Enlisted Association on February 18, 1963. Today the organization has 65 active chapters in the United States.

TREA is incorporated in Colorado and has a congressional charter under Title 36 of the United States Code. It is governed by a volunteer Board of Directors (BOD) elected by the general membership. Any enlisted person, retired from an active or reserve component of the United States armed forces, either for length of service or permanent medical disability is eligible for membership.

References

External links

External links
  
  
 
  
 
 
 

Non-profit organizations based in Colorado
Veterans' affairs in the United States
American veterans' organizations
Patriotic and national organizations chartered by the United States Congress